Culver Avenue is a former Rochester Industrial and Rapid Transit Railway station located in Rochester, New York. It was closed in 1956 along with the rest of the line.

This station was built at Culver Road in a cutting that had once been the bed of the Erie Canal and is now a section of the Eastern Expressway, with a siding on the south side to the National Guard Armory

The Armory had originally been home to the 121st Cavalry Regiment, and in 2012 the building was repurposed into a mixed-use development Culver Road Armory, containing restaurants, offices, retail and residences.

References

External links
Culver Road Armory

Railway stations in Rochester, New York
Railway stations in the United States opened in 1918
Railway stations closed in 1956
1918 establishments in New York (state)
1956 disestablishments in New York (state)